René Tengstedt (born 2 January 1976) is a Danish former professional footballer who played as a midfielder. He later worked as a coach.

Club career
Tengstedt played club football for Aalborg Chang, F.C. Copenhagen, Næstved IF, Fortuna Düsseldorf, Lyngby FC, Fremad Amager and B.93.

By April 2005, at the age of 29, he has retired from professional football, and combined playing for amateur club Aalborg Chang (the club he began his career with) with training to be a teacher. By October 2006 he was working as a player-manager of the club, alongside Jari Pedersen.

International career
He represented Denmark at under-19 youth level.

References

1976 births
Living people
Danish men's footballers
Denmark youth international footballers
Aalborg Chang players
F.C. Copenhagen players
Næstved Boldklub players
Fortuna Düsseldorf players
Lyngby Boldklub players
Fremad Amager players
Boldklubben af 1893 players
Danish Superliga players
2. Bundesliga players
Association football midfielders
Danish expatriate men's footballers
Danish expatriate sportspeople in Germany
Expatriate footballers in Germany
Danish football managers
Aalborg Chang managers